Anna Karenina is a 1914 Russian drama film directed and written by Vladimir Gardin.

Plot 
The film is based on the 1877 novel by Leo Tolstoy.

Cast 
 Maria Germanova as Anna Karenina
 Vladimir Shaternikov as Karenin
 Mikhail Tamarov as Vronsky
 Zoya Barantsevich as Kittie
 V. Obolensky as Levin
 Vladimir Kvanin as Stiva Oblonsky
 Moreva as Dolly
 Vera Kholodnaya as Italian wet-nurse (uncredited)

Interesting facts 
The film is 2700 meters long. 

A one-part excerpt from the film has been preserved.

References

External links 
 
 

1914 films
1910s Russian-language films
Films based on Anna Karenina
Russian silent films
Russian black-and-white films
Films of the Russian Empire
Russian drama films
1914 drama films
Silent drama films